The 6th National Spelling Bee was held at the National Museum in Washington, D.C. on May 27, 1930. Scripps-Howard would not sponsor the Bee until 1941. 

The winner was 14-year-old Helen Jensen of Council Bluffs, Iowa, correctly spelling the word albumen.(28 May 1930). Tall Corn Girl Wins National Spelling Bee, Pittsburgh Press (nothing that 2nd place winner missed "asceticism"; Jensen had to correctly spell that word and "albumen" to win). Ruth Des Jardins of Michigan came in second, who stumbled on "asceticism", followed by Mildred Froning of Indiana, who went out on "conflagration".

The final hour of the contest was broadcast on radio, starting at 3pm Eastern standard time, by the National Broadcasting Company.

There were 24 contestants this year.
First place received $1000, followed by $500 for second place, and $250 for third.

References

06
1930 in education
1930 in Washington, D.C.
May 1930 events